The  is the ruins of a Buddhist nunnery located in the city of Ichihara, Chiba, Japan which was part of the  provincial temple complex ("kokubunji") of former Kazusa Province.The temple ruins were designated a National Historic Site in 1983, with the area under protection expanded in 1985.

Overview

The Kazusa Kokubun-niji was located on the northern bank of the Yōrō River, in an area with a high concentration of kofun and ancient sites, and is separated from the Kazusa Kokubun-ji, which was located a short distance to the southwest, by a shallow valley. After several archaeological excavations starting in 1948, the layout of the temple was confirmed. The total area of the temple complex was 372 meters north-to-south by 285 meters east-to-west, for a total area of 123,000 square meters, making it the largest nunnery in the kokubunji system yet discovered. The central enclosure, containing the main structures of the nunnery, measured 200 meters north-to-south by 170 meters east-to-west. The foundation stones for the South Gate, Middle Gate, Kondō, Lecture Hall, Cloisters, bell tower, sutra tower, and the residential building for the nuns have been found. In addition, there are traces of a metal workshop, medicinal plants garden and infirmary. It also contains a large diorama showing how the temple complex may originally have looked. The site is a ten-minute walk from the Ichihara City Hall bus stop on the Kominato Railway Bus from Goi Station on the JR East Uchibo Line.

See also
Provincial temple
List of Historic Sites of Japan (Chiba)

References

External links

Prefectural Tourist Information 
Ichihara City home page 

Buddhist temples in Chiba Prefecture
Nara period
Ichihara, Chiba
History of Chiba Prefecture
Historic Sites of Japan
Kazusa Province
8th-century establishments in Japan
8th-century Buddhist temples
Buddhist archaeological sites in Japan